Anna Linnea Christina Kjellbin (born 16 March 1994) is a Swedish ice hockey defenceman and member of the Swedish national ice hockey team, currently playing with Luleå HF/MSSK of the Swedish Women's Hockey League (SDHL). The thirteenth longest-tenured player in SDHL history, she has won the SDHL championship twice. Kjellbin represented Sweden at the IIHF Women's World Championship in 2016 and 2017.

Playing career 
Kjellbin grew up in Mölndal, in Göteborg, and began skating at age four. As a child, she participated in various sports and games, including golf, swimming, football, and chess. From 2008 to 2010, she split her time between the Hanhals IF women's team and the U16 boys' team. In her rookie Riksserien season, 2009–10, she picked up five assists in 28 games as Hanhals finished second to last.

In 2010, she signed with Linköping HC Dam, choosing the club over an offer from HV71 Dam. She won the Riksserien championship twice with the club in 2014 and 2015. In the 2015–16 season, she scored a career-high 21 points in 36 games. She scored 6 points in 36 games in the 2018–19 season and, before the beginning of the playoffs, announced that she would take a break from hockey for personal reasons. She later revealed that she had sustained concussions in two different games, which caused

She joined HV71 in 2019, after nine seasons with Linköping, seeking a change in environment and because her job outside of hockey was based in Jönköping. She scored 11 points in 36 games in her first season with HV71, as the club finished in first place during the regular season and made it to the playoff finals against Luleå HF/MSSK before the season was canceled due to the COVID-19 pandemic in Sweden. She criticized the league's decision not to award the championship to any team, despite HV71 having won the first and only completed match of the finals, stating that: "Considering the season we had, it feels very empty." She returned to HV71 for the 2020–21 season and was the team's third highest scoring defenseman in the regular season.

In June 2021, Kjellbin signed with Luleå HF/MSSK for the 2021–22 SDHL season +1.

International career 
Kjellbin was a member of the Swedish national under-18 ice hockey team at the 2011 IIHF World Women's U18 Championship, getting two assists in five games. She represented Sweden again at the 2012 IIHF World Women's U18 Championship, getting four points in six games as Sweden won bronze and scoring her first international hat-trick in their group stage match against Russia after being selected to take a penalty shot. She won a gold medal with Sweden at the 2012 Winter Youth Olympics.

Kjellbin represented Sweden at the 2016 and 2017 IIHF Women's World Championships.

Personal life 
Outside of hockey, she works as Director of Customer Project Management for Senion, an indoor GPS technology company based in Linköping.

She is in a relationship with Finnish national team defenceman Ronja Savolainen.

Her father, Magnus, played ice hockey professionally in the Swedish Hockeytvåan in the 1970s.

References

External links
 
 

1994 births
Living people
Ice hockey people from Gothenburg
Swedish women's ice hockey defencemen
Ice hockey players at the 2012 Winter Youth Olympics
Youth Olympic gold medalists for Sweden
Linköping HC Dam players
HV71 Dam players
LGBT ice hockey players
Swedish LGBT sportspeople
Lesbian sportswomen
Luleå HF/MSSK players
21st-century LGBT people
Olympic ice hockey players of Sweden
Ice hockey players at the 2022 Winter Olympics